Elida is a village in Allen County, Ohio, United States. The population was 1,905 at the 2010 census. It is included in the Lima, Ohio Metropolitan Statistical Area.

History
Elida was laid out in 1852. A post office called Elida was established in 1854, and remained in operation until 1959. The village was incorporated in 1878.

Geography
Elida is located at  (40.786450, -84.197823).

Demographics

2010 census
As of the census of 2010, there were 1,905 people, 708 households, and 559 families living in the village. The racial makeup of the village was 94.3% White, 2.6% African American, 0.1% Native American, 0.8% Asian, 0.7% from other races, and 1.6% from two or more races. Hispanic or Latino of any race were 1.6% of the population.

There were 708 households, of which 37.0% had children under the age of 18 living with them, 65.0% were married couples living together, 9.0% had a female householder with no husband present, 4.9% had a male householder with no wife present, and 21.0% were non-families. 18.1% of all households were made up of individuals, and 7.7% had someone living alone who was 65 years of age or older. The average household size was 2.69 and the average family size was 3.04.

The median age in the village was 40.2 years. 26.4% of residents were under the age of 18; 7.3% were between the ages of 18 and 24; 21.5% were from 25 to 44; 32.7% were from 45 to 64; and 12.1% were 65 years of age or older. The gender makeup of the village was 48.7% male and 51.3% female.

2000 census
As of the census of 2000, there were 1,917 people, 698 households, and 552 families living in the village. The population density was 1,852.1 people per square mile (711.7/km2). There were 717 housing units at an average density of 692.7 per square mile (266.2/km2). The racial makeup of the village was 95.72% White, 1.93% African American, 0.57% Asian, 0.05% Pacific Islander, 0.73% from other races, and 0.99% from two or more races. Hispanic or Latino of any race were 1.46% of the population.

There were 698 households, out of which 41.4% had children under the age of 18 living with them, 67.6% were married couples living together, 9.5% had a female householder with no husband present, and 20.8% were non-families. 18.5% of all households were made up of individuals, and 8.0% had someone living alone who was 65 years of age or older. The average household size was 2.75 and the average family size was 3.15.

In the village, the population was spread out, with 30.2% under the age of 18, 6.6% from 18 to 24, 28.6% from 25 to 44, 23.7% from 45 to 64, and 11.0% who were 65 years of age or older. The median age was 37 years. For every 100 females there were 95.6 males. For every 100 females age 18 and over, there were 90.2 males.

The median income for a household in the village was $49,293, and the median income for a family was $58,750. Males had a median income of $41,895 versus $26,635 for females. The per capita income for the village was $20,573. About 3.1% of families and 3.1% of the population were below the poverty line, including 3.4% of those under age 18 and 2.4% of those age 65 or over.

Education
Elida has a public library, a branch of the Allen County Library.

Notable people
 Dakota Mathias, NBA basketball player
 Floyd Gahman, landscape artist
 Zachary Green, WWE Nash Carter

References

Villages in Allen County, Ohio
Villages in Ohio
1852 establishments in Ohio
Populated places established in 1852